The 1968–69 season was the 58th season in Hajduk Split’s history and their 23rd in the Yugoslav First League. Their 4th place finish in the 1967–68 season meant it was their 23rd successive season playing in the Yugoslav First League.

Competitions

Overall

Yugoslav First League

Classification

Matches

Yugoslav First League

Sources: hajduk.hr

Yugoslav Cup

Sources: hajduk.hr

Mitropa Cup

Sources: hajduk.hr

Player seasonal records

Top scorers

Source: Competitive matches

See also
1968–69 Yugoslav First League
1968–69 Yugoslav Cup

External sources
 1968–69 Yugoslav First League at rsssf.com
 1968–69 Yugoslav Cup at rsssf.com
 1968–69 Mitropa Cup at rsssf.com

HNK Hajduk Split seasons
Hajduk Split